At least two ships of the Hellenic Navy have borne the name Thyella ("Storm"):

 , a  launched in 1907 and sunk in 1941.
 , a  launched in 1942 as USS Bradford transferred to Greece in 1962 and renamed. She was scrapped in 1981.

Hellenic Navy ship names